Irvan Yunus Mofu (born 8 February 1992) is an Indonesian professional footballer who plays as a forward for Liga 2 club Persipura Jayapura.

Career

Persita Tangerang
He made his debut in Persita Tangerang when he plays in 2014 Inter Island Cup.

Perseru Serui
Irvan joined in the squad for 2016 Indonesia Soccer Championship A.

Persiraja Banda Aceh
In 2019, Mofu signed a year contract with Persiraja Banda Aceh. He made 22 league appearances and scored 2 goals for Persiraja in the 2019 Liga 2.

PSKC Cimahi
In 2021, Irvan signed a contract with Indonesian Liga 2 club PSKC Cimahi. He made his league debut on 27 September in a 2–1 loss against Perserang Serang, and he also scored his first goal for PSKC in the 90rd minute at the Gelora Bung Karno Madya Stadium, Jakarta.

References

External links
 Irvan Mofu at Soccerway
 Irvan Mofu at Liga Indonesia

1991 births
Living people
Indonesian footballers
Perseman Manokwari players
Persita Tangerang players
Persepam Madura Utama players
Perseru Serui players
Persiraja Banda Aceh players
Persipura Jayapura players
Indonesian Premier Division players
Liga 2 (Indonesia) players
Liga 1 (Indonesia) players
Association football midfielders
Indonesian expatriate footballers
Indonesian expatriate sportspeople in East Timor
Expatriate footballers in East Timor
Sportspeople from South Sulawesi